Animositisomina is the eighth studio album by American industrial metal band Ministry, released on February 18, 2003 by Sanctuary Records.

Background
The album's title is a palindrome made of the word "animosity" spelled without the final letter and both forward and backward. According to an interview on Fuse's Uranium, Jourgensen was bored at the time he was coming up with an album title. It is Ministry's first album to feature lyrics in the album sleeve, which prior albums did not provide.

"The Light Pours Out of Me" was written and originally recorded by Magazine for their Real Life album in 1978 and it is the only song in the album to have more than one word in the title. Ministry performed the song several times in concerts in the late 1980s, but it was never released or recorded officially.

Animositisomina is the last Ministry album with Paul Barker, thus ending the band's "Hypo Luxa/Hermes Pan" production duo. In addition, it is also the last album to feature Ministry performing in their traditional industrial metal style before switching to a more thrash-oriented sound on their next album, Houses of the Molé.

In April 2016, Jourgensen called Animositisomina his least-favourite Ministry album, declaring it was "not fun to make" as he was finally quitting heroin cold turkey during the recording sessions. Additionally, his relationship with Barker's had become antagonistic, which prompted the latter to quit the band after the Animositisomina tour. "Leper," the last song on the album, was left as an instrumental as Jourgensen had left the studio earlier than scheduled and was uninterested in writing lyrics. Jourgensen considers Animositisomina a "non-album" and left most of the recording responsibilities to Barker.

Track listing

Personnel

Ministry
Al Jourgensen – vocals (1-8), guitars (1-8, 10), keyboards (1, 4-6, 8, 10), de-programming, production
Paul Barker – bass, programming, keyboards (2, 5, 7, 9, 10), vocals (9), rhythm guitar (5, 7, 9), production

Additional personnel
Max Brody – drums and percussion, programming (1, 4, 5, 7, 9, 10), sax (9)
Adam Grossman – guitars (1)
Rey Washam – drums and percussion (2–4, 8)
Louis Svitek – guitars (2–4, 8)
Angela Lukacin-Jourgensen – background vocals (4)
Kathryn Kinslow – chorus vocals (8)
Justin Leeah - engineer
Joey Cazares - assistant engineer
Bobby Torres - assistant engineer
Paul Elledge - art & direction
Leasha Elledge - art & direction
Tim Bruce - design
Tom Baker - mastering

Chart positions

References

External links

2003 albums
Albums produced by Al Jourgensen
Ministry (band) albums
Sanctuary Records albums
Albums recorded at Sonic Ranch